A list of invasive plant species in California. 

Numerous plants have been introduced to the California Floristic Province and within the state's borders. Many of them have become invasive species and/or noxious weeds.
The following are some of these species:

List

Acacia dealbata—silver wattle
Acacia melanoxylon—blackwood acacia
Acacia paradoxa—paradox acacia
Agrostis avenacea—Pacific bentgrass
Ailanthus altissima—tree-of-heaven
Aira caryophyllea
Allium neapolitanum—white garlic
Alliaria petiolata
Alternanthera philoxeroides—alligatorweed
Alternanthera sessilis—sessile joyweed
Ammophila arenaria
Ammophila breviligulata
Ampelodesmos
Andropogon virginicus
Arctotheca calendula—capeweed
Artemisia biennis
Anthoxanthum odoratum—sweet vernal grass
Arundo donax—giant reed
Asparagus aethiopicus
Asparagus asparagoides—bridal creeper
Atriplex lindleyi
Atriplex rosea
Atriplex semibaccata—Australian saltbush
Atriplex suberecta
Avena barbata—slender oat
Avena fatua—wild oats
Avena sterilis—animated oat
Azolla pinnata
Brachypodium distachyon—annual false-brome
Brachypodium sylvaticum—slender false-brome
Brassica nigra—black mustard
Brassica rapa-field mustard
Brassica tournefortii
Briza maxima—rattlesnake grass
Bromus alopecuros
Bromus arenarius
Bromus catharticus
Bromus commutatus
Bromus diandrus—ripgut brome
Bromus hordeaceus—soft chess
Bromus madritensis ssp. rubens—red brome
Bromus secalinus
Bromus sterilis
Bromus tectorum—cheatgrass
Broom (plant)
Cardaria draba—whitetop
Carduus acanthoides
Carduus crispus
Carduus nutans—musk thistle
Carduus pycnocephalus—Italian thistle
Carduus tenuiflorus—winged plumeless thistle
Carpobrotus chilensis—sea-fig
Carpobrotus edulis—iceplant
Castor oil plant
Caulerpa taxifolia
Centaurea calcitrapa—purple starthistle
Centaurea diffusa—diffuse knapweed
Centaurea iberica—Iberian knapweed
Centaurea solstitialis—yellow starthistle
Centaurea sulphurea—sulphur knapweed
Centaurea virgata—squarrose knapweed
Chenopodiastrum murale
Chenopodium vulvaria
Chloris gayana
Cirsium arvense—Canada thistle
Cirsium ochrocentrum—yellowspine thistle
Cirsium vulgare—bull thistle
Cistus monspeliensis
Conium
Cordyline australis—New Zealand cabbage tree
Cortaderia jubata—pampasgrass
Cortaderia selloana—white pampasgrass
Cotoneaster franchetii—Cotoneaster
Cotoneaster lacteus—Parney's Cotoneaster
Cotoneaster pannosus—silverleaf cotoneaster
Crataegus monogyna—common hawthorn
Crocosmia x crocosmiiflora—montbretia
Cynara cardunculus—cardoon thistle
Cynanchum louiseae
Cynodon dactylon—Bermuda grass
Cyperus rotundus
Cytisus multiflorus
Cytisus scoparius—Scotch broom
Cytisus striatus—Portuguese broom
Dactylis glomerata—orchard grass
Dactyloctenium aegyptium
Delairea odorata—Cape ivy, German ivy
Digitalis purpurea—foxglove
Diplotaxis muralis
Diplotaxis tenuifolia
Dittrichia graveolens
Echium candicans—pride-of-Madeira
Eichhornia crassipes—water hyacinth
Elaeagnus angustifolia—Russian olive
Equisetum—horsetail
Equisetum hyemale—scouringrush horsetail
Eragrostis cilianensis—candy grass
Erica lusitanica—Spanish heath
Erodium botrys—broadleaf filaree
Erodium cicutarium—redstem filaree
Erysimum repandum
Eucalyptus camaldulensis—red gum
Eucalyptus globulus—blue gum
Euphorbia peplus
Fallopia baldschuanica
Fennel
Festuca arundinacea—coarse fescue
Festuca myuros—red-tailed fescue
Ficus carica—edible fig
Foeniculum vulgare—fennel
Gazania linearis—gazania
Genista canariensis—Canary Islands broom
Genista linifolia—Mediterranean broom
Genista monosperma—bridal veil broom
Genista monspessulana—French broom
Geranium dissectum—cutleaf geranium
Geranium molle—covesfoot cranesbill
Glyceria declinata—mannagrass
Hedera canariensis—Algerian ivy
Hedera helix—English ivy
Hedypnois cretica
Helichrysum petiolare—licorice plant
Hirschfeldia incana—Mediterranean mustard
Heteranthera limosa
Holcus lanatus—velvet grass, Yorkshire fog
Hordeum marinum—Mediterranean barley
Hordeum murinum—hare barley
Hyparrhenia hirta
Hypericum canariense—Canary Island St. Johnswort
Hypericum perforatum—St. John's Wort
Ilex aquifolium—English holly
Ipomoea cairica—Coast Morning Glory
Ipomoea indica—blue morning glory
Iris missouriensis—western blue flag iris
Iris pseudacorus—yellowflag iris
Ivy
Kali tragus
Koenigia polystachya (syn. Polygonum polystachyum)
Lantana montevidensis—purple lantana
Leucanthemum vulgare—ox-eye daisy
Ligustrum ovalifolium—California privet
Limnobium laevigatum
Limonium perezii—sea lavender
Limonium ramosissimum ssp. provincale—Algerian sea lavender
Lobularia maritima—sweet alyssum
Lolium multiflorum—Italian ryegrass
Ludwigia hexapetala—creeping waterprimrose
Malva nicaeensis
Marrubium vulgare—horehound
Medicago polymorpha—burclover
Melilotus indicus
Mentha pulegium—pennyroyal
Mesembryanthemum crystallinum—common iceplant
Myoporum laetum—myoporum
Myosotis latifolia—common forget-me-not
Myriophyllum aquaticum—parrotfeather
Myriophyllum spicatum—spike watermilfoil
Nassella manicata—Andean tussockgrass
Nicotiana glauca—tree tobacco
Nymphaeaceae—water lilies
Oenothera glazioviana—redsepal evening primrose
Olea europaea—olive
Onopordum acanthium—Scotch thistle
Oncosiphon pilulifer-sinkweed
Oxalis pes-caprae—Bermuda buttercup
Parietaria judaica—spreading pellitory
Paspalum dilatatum—dallisgrass
Pennisetum clandestinum—kikuyugrass
Pennisetum setaceum—fountain grass
Phalaris aquatica—harding grass
Phoenix canariensis—Canary Island date palm
Piptatherum miliaceum—smilo grass
Pistacia atlantica
Plantago lanceolata—English plantain
Poa pratensis—Kentucky bluegrass
Polygonum arenastrum
Polypogon australis—beardgrass
Prunus cerasifera—cherry plum
Prunus lusitanica—Portuguese laurel
Psathyrostachys juncea
Puccinellia distans
Pyracantha angustifolia—narrowleaf firethorn
Pyracantha coccinea—European firethorn
Pyracantha crenulata—firethorn
Ranunculus repens—creeping buttercup
Raphanus sativus—wild radish
Retama monosperma—bridal veil broom
Reynoutria japonica (syn. Polygonum cuspidatum)—Japanese knotweed
Ricinus communis—castor bean
Robinia pseudoacacia—black locust
Rubus armeniacus—Himalayan blackberry
Rubus laciniatus—barbwire Russian thistle
Rumex crispus—curly dock
Saccharum ravennae—ravennagrass
Salsola paulsenii—barbwire Russian thistle
Salsola soda—oppositeleaf Russian thistle
Salsola tragus—Russian thistle
Salvia aethiopis—African sage
Schinus molle—Peruvian/California pepper tree
Schinus terebinthifolius—Brazilian pepper tree
Setaria verticillata
Silybum marianum—milk thistle
Sinapis arvensis—canola
Solanum elaeagnifolium
Solanum lanceolatum
Spartina alterniflora—smooth cordgrass
Spartina densiflora—Chilean cordgrass
Spartina patens—Salt marsh hay
Spartium—broom
Spartium junceum—Spanish broom
Stipa capensis—cape ricegrass
Tamarix aphylla—athol
Tamarix chinensis—Chinese tamarisk
Tamarix gallica—French tamarisk
Tamarix parviflora—smallflower tamarisk
Tamarix ramosissima—salt cedar, tamarisk
Tanacetum vulgare—common tansy
Tetragonia tetragonioides—New Zealand spinach
Torilis arvensis—spreading hedgeparsley
Trifolium angustifolium
Trifolium dubium
Trifolium hirtum—rose clover
Trisetum flavescens
Ulex—gorse
Ulex europaeus—common gorse
Undaria pinnatifida—wakame
Verbascum thapsus—wooly mullein
Vinca
Vinca major—periwinkle
Vinca minor—dwarf periwinkle
Viola labradorica
Vulpia myuros
Wakame
Washingtonia robusta—Mexican fan palm
Watsonia meriana—watsonia
Zantedeschia aethiopica—calla lily
Zostera japonica—Japanese eelgrass

See also
List of California native plants
Invasive species in the United States
Natural history of California

External links
California
Cal-IPC: California Invasive Plant Inventory Database List
USDA PLANTS Database: California State Noxious Weeds List
Cal-IPC: California Invasive Plant Council homepage + information.
Cal-IPC: CalWeedMapper
California Native Plant Society—CNPS: Invasive Weeds + links.
UC IPM" Invasive Plants of California — managing invasive plants.
PlantRight.org: address and stop sale of invasive garden plants in California
National Invasive Species Information Center: California Invasive Species Lists

Invasive
Environment of California
Invasive plant species
Natural history of California
California